John W. Lippitt (April 21, 1822 in Adams, Berkshire County, Massachusetts – May 15, 1896 in Solsville, Madison County, New York) was an American politician from New York.

Life
The family removed to a farm near the hamlet of Solsville. He attended the common schools and Stockbridge Academy.

He was Supervisor of the Town of Madison for many terms, beginning in 1861; and Chairman of the Board of Supervisors of Madison County for more than twelve years.

He was a member of the New York State Assembly (Madison Co., 1st D.) in 1864 and 1872; and of the New York State Senate (21st D.) in 1878 and 1879.

He was buried at the Indian Opening Cemetery in Madison.

Sources
 Civil List and Constitutional History of the Colony and State of New York compiled by Edgar Albert Werner (1884; pg. 291, 366 and 373)
 The State Government for 1879 by Charles G. Shanks (Weed, Parsons & Co, Albany NY, 1879; pg. 62)
 John W. Lippitt at Oswego County Government
 Cemetery transcriptions

1822 births
1896 deaths
Republican Party New York (state) state senators
People from Adams, Massachusetts
People from Madison, New York
Town supervisors in New York (state)
Republican Party members of the New York State Assembly
19th-century American politicians